Empty Room may refer to:
 "Empty Room", a song on the album The Suburbs by Canadian band Arcade Fire
 "Empty Room" (Sanna Nielsen song), a song by Swedish recording artist Sanna Nielsen
 Empty Room, an album by Swedish recording artist Magnus Rosén
 Empty Room, an album by American composer Zack Hemsey
 Empty Room, an album by American saxophonist Sal Nistico
 Empty Room / Nutshell, 2011 Brian Adams double single

See also
 Empty Rooms, 1970 studio album by John Mayall
 "Empty Rooms", Gary Moore single from the album Victims of the Future